(born 9 January 1975), born Zhou Xuan, is a Chinese-born table tennis player who represented Japan at the 2004 Summer Olympics.

References

1975 births
Living people
Table tennis players from Beijing
Japanese male table tennis players
Chinese emigrants to Japan
Chinese male table tennis players
Table tennis players at the 2004 Summer Olympics
Olympic table tennis players of Japan
Naturalised table tennis players